Manfred Erjautz (born 1966 in Graz) is an Austrian artist.

Life and work 
From 1985 to 1990 Manfred Erjautz studied at the Academy of Fine Arts Vienna under Prof. Bruno Gironcoli.

Manfred Erjautz is a versatile Austrian contemporary artist who works with the genres of sculpture, installation, graphics and photography, in addition to producing art for public spaces. His oeuvre is always considered to be conceptual and is characterized by formal clarity. Logos, bar codes, advertising texts, objects and material with specified content (Lego) are Erjautz' main materials. In 1989, early in his career, the artist already used Lego bricks to create some of his sculptures. The first work made of Lego was a gun used in a fictitious bank robbery filmed by a surveillance camera. By building an electric chair out of Lego bricks in another work he reversed the original meaning of Lego "play well" (Danish: leg godt). A controversial Lego cross, which featured a Lego truck instead of the body of Christ, was installed on the altar of the Jesuit Church, Vienna in 2004. The playful character of the Lego should relativize the seriousness and ceremoniousness of the liturgy (more than vice versa). One day before Christmas Eve 2008, the sculpture was vandalised with parts stolen by unknown perpetrators. It has been relocated to a much safer place on the pulpit.

Works in collections 
 Neue Galerie Graz – Universalmuseum Joanneum, Graz
 Upper Austrian State Museum, Linz
 Lentos Art Museum, Linz
 Museum der Moderne Salzburg, Salzburg
 Austrian Sculpture Park, Unterpremstätten
 Albertina, Vienna
 Generali Foundation, Vienna
 MAK – Museum of Applied Arts, Vienna
 Museum Moderner Kunst Stiftung Ludwig – MUMOK, Vienna
 TBA21 – Thyssen-Bornemisza Art Contemporary, Vienna
 Vienna Secession, Vienna
 The Schaufler Foundation, Sindelfingen, Germany
 Studio Stefania Miscetti, Rome, Italy

Recognition 
 1999 
 2008 Humanic Award
 1991 Austria Tabak Award

Museum exhibitions and biennials (selection) 
 1990 Österreichische Skulptur, Erste Allgemeine Generali Foundation, Secession, Vienna, Austria
 1991 Un Musée en Voyage, Musée d'art contemporain de Lyon, France
 1991 Junge Österreicher, Szombathely/Keptar, Hungary
 1992 3. Internationale Biennale Istanbul, Turkey
 1993 La coestistenza dell' arte, Biennale di Venezia, Venedig, Italy
 1993 Konfrontationen, Museum moderner Kunst, Stiftung Ludwig, Vienna, Austria
 1994 International Biennale for Printed Graphics, Zagreb, Croatia
 1996 jenseits von kunst, Ludwig Múzeum, Museum of Contemporary Art, Budapest, Hungary
 1996 Elektrischer Stuhl, Vienna Secession, Austria
 1998 Disidentico maschile femminile e oltre, Palazzo Branciforte, Palermo and Museo di Castelnuovo, Neapel, Italy 
 1998 Freeze Frame, University of South Florida, Contemporary Art Museum (USFCAM), Tampa, USA
 1999 As the matter stands, L.A. International Biennal, Patricia Faure Gallery, Los Angeles, USA
 1999 6/7, The Living Art Museum, Reykjavik, Iceland
 1999 Kvaliplasztik, Kunsthalle Szombathely, Hungary
 2001 Days of hope, Biennale die Venezia, Venedig, Italy
 ME/WE, Vienna Secession, Vienna, Austria
 2004 Farbige Plastik, Salzburg, Austria
 2005 Lichtkunst aus Kunstlicht, ZKM Karlsruhe, Germany
 2006 Krieg der Knöpfe, Ursula Blickle Stiftung, Kraichtal-Unteröwisheim, Germany
 2008 Under Pain of Death, ACI, New York City
 2008 Zu Gironcoli, eine Hommage II, Gironcoli Museum Schloss Herberstein, St. Johann bei Herberstein, Styria, Austria
 2010 Körpercodes. Menschenbilder aus der Sammlung, Museum der Moderne, MdM Salzburg, Austria
 2011 Puppen-Projektionsfiguren in der Kunst, Museum Villa Rot, Burgrieden, Germany
 2012 Gold, Belvedere, Vienna, Austria
 2012 Die Sammlung, 21er Haus, Vienna, Austria
 2012 European Glass Context 2012, Bornholm Art Museum, Gudhjem, Denmark
 2012 Der nackte Mann, Lentos Art Museum, Linz, Austria
 2013 Vom Raum zur Fläche, Museum Liaunig, Neuhaus, Austria
 2013 Un bonhomme de neige en été, Atelier 340 Muzeum, Brüssel, Belgium

External links 

 Kulturserver Graz: Manfred Erjautz 
 
 Artist page Manfred Erjautz at Mario Mauroner Contemporary Art Salzburg-Vienna

Sources 

1966 births
Austrian installation artists
Living people